The mathematical manuscripts of Karl Marx are a manuscript collection of Karl Marx's mathematical notes where he attempted to derive the foundations of infinitesimal calculus from first principles. 

The notes that Marx took have been collected into four independent treatises: On the Concept of the Derived Function, On the Differential, On the History of Differential Calculus, and Taylor's Theorem, MacLaurin's Theorem, and Lagrange's Theory of Derived Functions, along with several notes, additional drafts, and supplements to these four treatises. These treatises attempt to construct a rigorous foundation for calculus and use historical materialism to analyze the history of mathematics.

Marx's contributions to mathematics did not have any impact on the historical development of calculus, and he was unaware of many more recent developments in the field at the time, such as the work of Cauchy. However, his work in some ways anticipated, but did not influence, some later developments in 20th century mathematics. These manuscripts, which are from around 1873–1883, were not published in any language until 1968 when they were published in the Soviet Union alongside a Russian translation. Since their publication, Marx's independent contributions to mathematics have been analyzed in terms of both his own historical and economic theories, and in light of their potential applications of nonstandard analysis.

Contents 
Marx left over 1000 manuscript pages of mathematical notes on his attempts at discovering the foundations of calculus. The majority of these manuscript pages have been collected into four papers, along with drafts and supplementary notes in the published editions of his collected works. In these works, Marx attempted to draw analogies between his theories of the history of economics and the development of calculus by constructing differential calculus in terms of mathematical symbols altered by an upheaval that would reveal their meaning.

On the Concept of the Derived Function 
Marx wrote On the Concept of the Derived Function in 1881,  just two years before his death. In this work, he demonstrates the mechanical steps needed to calculate a derivative for several basic functions from first principles. Despite the fact that Marx's principle sources primarily relied on geometric arguments for the definition of the derivative, Marx's explanations rely much more strongly on algebraic explanations than geometric ones, suggesting he likely preferred to think of things algebraically. Fahey et al. state that although "We might be alarmed to find a student writing 0/0... [Marx] was well aware of what he was doing when he wrote '0/0'" However, Marx was evidently disturbed by the implications of this, stating that "The closely held belief of some rationalising mathematicians that dy and dx are quantitatively actually only infinitely small, only approaching 0/0, is a chimera...".

On the Differential 
In On the Differential, Marx tries to construct the definition of a derivative dy/dx from first principles, without using the definition of a limit. He appears to have primarily used an elementary textbook written by the French mathematician Boucharlat, who had primarily used the traditional limit definition of the derivative, but Marx appears to have intentionally avoiding doing so in his definition of the derivative.

Fahey et al. state that, as evidenced by the four separate drafts of this paper, Marx wrote it with considerable care.

On the History of Differential Calculus 
Fahey et al. state that although Marx never used this term in his mathematical papers, his history of calculus can be understood in terms of thesis, antithesis, synthesis. Marx identified three historical phases of development - the "mystical" differential calculus of Newton and Leibniz, the "rational" differential calculus of d'Alembert, and the "purely algebraic" differential calculus of Lagrange. However, as Marx was not aware of the work of Cauchy, he did not carry his historical development any further.

Legacy

Historian of science Kathryn Olesko states that, contrary to many claims made by both Engels and the publishers of Marx's manuscripts, Marx's work did not "solve the historical and conceptual riddle of calculus." Mathematician Hubert Kennedy observes that Marx "seems to have been unaware of the advances being made by continental mathematicians in the foundations of differential calculus, including the work of Cauchy." and that although Marx's study of differentials had "no immediate effect on the historical development of mathematics" he concedes however that at least Engels' claim of "independent discoveries" made by Marx is "certainly justified" and that Marx's definition of the differential "anticipated [some] 20th century developments in mathematics."

Joseph Dauben speculates that Marx's developments in calculus may have also contributed to an interest in nonstandard analysis among Chinese mathematicians.

Editions and translations
Although Engels stated his intent to publish the "extremely important mathematical manuscripts left by Marx" in 1885, it was not until 1933 that parts of the manuscripts were published in Russian—for the journal Under the Banner of Marxism and collection Marxism and Science. The documents were first fully published in 1968, in both German and Russian, with the latter edited by Sofya Yanovskaya. An English translation was first published in 1983.

Notes

References

Further reading 

1968 non-fiction books
Mathematics manuscripts
Books published posthumously
Books by Karl Marx
dialectical materialism